The Puy Foradado Dam was a Roman arch-gravity dam in Zaragoza province, Aragon, Spain, dating to the 2nd or 3rd century AD.

See also 
 List of Roman dams and reservoirs
 Roman architecture
 Roman engineering

Notes

References 
 

Roman dams in Spain
Arch-gravity dams
Province of Zaragoza